Actin-related protein 2/3 complex subunit 1B is a protein that in humans is encoded by the ARPC1B gene.

Function 

This gene encodes one of seven subunits of the human Arp2/3 protein complex. This subunit is a member of the SOP2 family of proteins and is most similar to the protein encoded by gene ARPC1A. The similarity between these two proteins suggests that they both may function as p41 subunit of the human Arp2/3 complex that facilitates branching of actin filaments in cells. Isoforms of the p41 subunit may adapt the functions of the complex to different cell types or developmental stages.  Indeed, it has recently been shown that variants of the Arp2/3 complex differ in their ability to promote actin assembly, with  complexes containing ARPC1B and ARPC5L being better at this than those containing ARPC1A and ARPC5. The differing functions of ARPC1A and ARPC1B are also evident in the recent discovery of patients with severe or total ARPC1B deficiency, who have platelet and immune system abnormalities yet survive, possibly due to a compensatory up-regulation of ARPC1A expression.

Interactions 

ARPC1B has been shown to interact with PAK1.

References

Further reading

External links